Nguyenkim Shopping Center (also known as Nguyenkim Electronic Appliance Center) is located in Ho Chi Minh City. It was started as an electronic retail in 1992 then expanded into a department store. The company has been growing in the past few years, and sees itself climbing the 100 top best companies in the world.

History 

The company is first founded in 1992 as an electronics store selling audios, videos, major appliances and small appliances. In 2001, the company was named as Nguyenkim Trading Joint Stock Company.

The company features products in audios/videos, major appliances, small appliances, computers, mobiles, and games.

References

External links
 Nguyenkim Website
 Nguyenkim.com SmartViper Website Analysis
 Sai Gon-Nguyen Kim Shopping Centre

Buildings and structures in Ho Chi Minh City